Robins Lane Halt was a short-lived railway station which served the south of St Helens, England.

The unstaffed Halt was on the short "Fast Lines" otherwise known as "The Passenger Lines" which ran from the St Helens to Widnes line at Sutton Oak Junction to the Manchester to Liverpool line next to St Helens Junction station.

History
In modern parlance the halt was opened by the LMS on a "use it or lose it" basis on 12 October 1936. Revenues failed to live up to hopes and it duly closed, less than two years later, on 26 September 1938. Frequent trains continued to pass through the site of the halt, running between St Helens Shaw St (as it then was) and St Helens Junction until they were withdrawn on 14 June 1965. The Fast Lines themselves were closed on 2 March 1969 and have been lifted.

References

Notes

Sources

External links

The station site on an 1888-1913 Overlay OS Map via National Library of Scotland]
The History of Transport in Sutton via Sutton Beauty
the station on a 1948 OS Map via npe maps
The station and line overlain on OS maps via Rail Maps Online

Disused railway stations in St Helens, Merseyside
Former London, Midland and Scottish Railway stations
Railway stations in Great Britain opened in 1936
Railway stations in Great Britain closed in 1938
1936 establishments in England
1938 disestablishments in England